Air Vice Marshal Md Shafiqul Alam BBP, OSP, BSP, ndc, fawc, psc is the incumbent Assistant Chief of Air Staff (Operations and Training). Earlier, he was Assistant Chief of Air Staff (Plans). He also served as Air Officer Commanding of Bangladesh Air Force (BAF) Base Bashar.

Career 
He was commissioned in Bangladesh Air Force in GD(P) branch on 30 December 1985. AVM Alam is currently serving as Director, Board of Directors of Biman Bangladesh Airlines as an additional responsibility. In several occasions, he served as acting chief of Air staff throughout October to December 2021.

References 

Year of birth missing (living people)
Living people
Place of birth missing (living people)
Biman Bangladesh Airlines
Bangladesh Air Force personnel
Bangladesh Air Force